Lance White is an American college basketball coach who most recently was the head coach of the Pittsburgh Panthers women's basketball team.

Career
White previously served as an assistant coach at Texas Tech and Florida State. He was an assistant at Texas Tech for 10 seasons and was named an assistant at FSU in 2003. White was named the head coach at Pitt in April 2018.  White stated at Pittsburgh for five years and was let go after the 2022–23 season.  White posted a record of 42–99 while coaching Pittsburgh and never won more than eleven games in a season.

Head coaching record

References

External links 
 Pitt Panthers bio

Living people
Florida State Seminoles women's basketball coaches
Pittsburgh Panthers women's basketball coaches
Texas Tech Lady Raiders basketball coaches
Texas Tech University alumni
Year of birth missing (living people)